Mavi-ye Sofla (also Romanized as Māvī-ye Soflá; also known as Māvī-ye Pā’īn) is a village in Seydun-e Jonubi Rural District, Seydun District, Bagh-e Malek County, Khuzestan Province, Iran. At the 2006 census, its population was 53, in 11 families.

References 

Populated places in Bagh-e Malek County